Bluey may refer to:

 Bluey (dog) (1910–1939), world's second-longest living dog
 "Bluey", a character in the Bluey and Curley (1939–1975) comic strip drawn by Alex Gurney
 Robert Bluey (born 1979), American conservative blogger and journalist
 Bluey (1976 TV series), a 1976 Australian police drama television series
 Bluey (2018 TV series), a 2018 Australian animated children's television series
 BFPO telegrams and electronic messages

See also
 Bluey (nickname), a list of people with the nickname "Bluey"
 Blueys Beach, a suburb of Pacific Palms, New South Wales, Australia
 Bluey Day Foundation, a defunct Australian charity